Podgorica is the capital and largest city of Montenegro. According to 2011 census, the population of Podgorica city proper is 150,799, while Podgorica Capital City (analogous to metropolitan area, and similar to opština/municipality subdivision in the rest of Montenegro) has a population of 185,937.

Historical population

Households

Dwellings

Ethnicity

Religion

Population by Subdivisions

Settlements in Montenegro are divided into subdivisions called Mjesna zajednica, or Local community. These are the smallest territorial subdivisions of Montenegro. However, Montenegrin Statistical office does not readily release data pertaining to local communities. Administration of Podgorica Capital City has divided Podgorica city proper into planning zones (planske cjeline), for their internal use, and those do have population statistics released, according to 2011 census. These do not correspond to either local communities or traditional Podgorica neighbourhoods, but are illustrative of distribution of Podgorica population. 

Data from Capital City documents vary slightly to those of Montenegrin Statistical Office. This might be due to usage of different definitions, different limits of city proper, or usage of preliminary data from 2011 census.

Settlements of Metro area

Capital City of Podgorica is divided into 141 settlements, of which 3 are defined as urban by Montenegrin Statistical Office (Podgorica city proper, Golubovci and Tuzi, while others are of rural character. Golubovci and Tuzi are centers of their own sub-municipalities (gradske opštine), that encompass most of southern and southeastern area of Podgorica Capital City, from Podgorica city proper to Skadar Lake. Golubovci sub-municipality has a population of 16,093, with Tuzi sub-municipality housing 12,096 residents.

Below is a list of settlements with population larger than 500 residents:

Most of the larger settlements are part of continuous rural sprawl around the towns of Golubovci and Tuzi, in the Zeta valley, situated in the southern part of Podgorica Capital City. In comparison, northern part of Capital City area is mountainous and very sparsely populated. 

The commuter belt of Podgorica extends beyond Podgorica capital city, mainly into the municipalities of Danilovgrad, Cetinje, Bar and Nikšić. Combined with the role of Podgorica as primate city of Montenegro, with national concentration of administrative, healthcare, educational and economic activities, daily population is likely significantly higher than official resident population.

References

Podgorica
Podgorica
Podgorica